Dakota Joshua (born May 15, 1996) is an American professional ice hockey forward who is currently playing for the Vancouver Canucks of the National Hockey League (NHL). He was selected 128th overall by the Toronto Maple Leafs in the 2014 NHL Entry Draft.

Early life
Joshua was born on May 15, 1996, in Dearborn, Michigan to mother Jullee. His mother had also played ice hockey growing up and competed in the Michigan Senior Women's Hockey League. His younger brother Jagger also plays hockey.

Playing career
Growing up in Michigan, Joshua played junior hockey for the Honeybaked U16 midget team and was invited to the USA Hockey Select National Team Evaluation Camp. Following the 2011–12 season, Joshua was drafted by the Sioux Falls Stampede in the third round of the United States Hockey League (USHL). After splitting the 2012–13 season between Honeybaked and the USHL, Joshua was drafted 156th overall by the Plymouth Whalers during the Ontario Hockey League Priority Selection. Despite being drafted, he continued to play in the USHL for the 2013–14 season and was ranked 157th overall amongst North American skaters by the NHL Central Scouting Bureau. Joshua was eventually selected in the fifth round, 128th overall, in the 2014 NHL Entry Draft by the Toronto Maple Leafs. He was unaware he had been drafted until he received a phone call from Toronto management while in the car. After drafting Joshua, Leafs amateur scouting director Dave Morrison spoke highly of him as a player, saying: "He’s tall, very athletic and we saw some flashes of real good skill towards the end of the year. His coaches couldn’t say enough good things about him. He’s very diligent in two ways of the game, a top nine potential player." Joshua spent two full seasons with the Stampede, during which he helped them win the 2015 Clark Cup championship.

In his freshman season at Ohio State, Joshua recorded 17 points in 29 games for the Buckeyes. He recorded his first collegiate goal, which turned out to be the game-winner, during a shootout against Michigan on January 17, 2016. However, two days later, he received a game suspension as a result of his actions during the contest against Michigan. He helped the Buckeyes qualify for the Big Ten Tournament but they lost in the semi-finals to the top-seeded Minnesota Golden Gophers. The following season, Joshua recorded 12 goals and 23 assists earning Honorable Mention All-B1G accolades in March 2017. As well, off the ice he was selected for the Ohio State Scholar-Athlete while majoring in Sport Industry and selected for the Academic All-Big Ten team.

On July 12, 2019, his rights were traded to the St. Louis Blues in exchange for future considerations.  Joshua made his NHL debut on March 1, 2021, against the Anaheim Ducks, scoring a goal. After scoring in his debut, Joshua said: "It was all I expected and then some. To play in the National Hockey League is the biggest honor you can have in the sport of hockey. So it was an unreal experience to be a part of the club today." He was reassigned to the taxi squad shortly after but called up again on March 5.

As a free agent from the Blues, Joshua was signed to a two-year, $1.65 million contract with the Vancouver Canucks on July 13, 2022.

Career statistics

Awards and honors

References

External links
 

1996 births
Living people
American men's ice hockey centers
Ohio State Buckeyes men's ice hockey players
Sportspeople from Dearborn, Michigan
Ice hockey players from Michigan
San Antonio Rampage players
Sioux Falls Stampede players
Springfield Thunderbirds players
St. Louis Blues players
Toronto Maple Leafs draft picks
Tulsa Oilers (1992–present) players
USA Hockey National Team Development Program players
Utica Comets players
Vancouver Canucks players